Angela Hanka (May 13, 1891 - February 1, 1963) was an Austrian figure skater who competed in ladies' singles.

She won the silver medal in ladies' single skating at the 1914 World Figure Skating Championships.

Competitive highlights

References 

Austrian female single skaters
1891 births
1963 deaths